Stilpnogyne is a genus of flowering plants in the groundsel tribe within the sunflower family.

Species
The only known species is Stilpnogyne bellioides, native to South Africa.

References

Senecioneae
Monotypic Asteraceae genera
Endemic flora of South Africa